These are the results for the women's individual trampoline competition, one of two events of the trampoline discipline contested in the gymnastics at the 2000 Summer Olympics in Sydney.

Results

Qualification
Twelve entrants competed in the qualifying round. The top eight progressed to the final round.

Final

References

http://www.la84foundation.org/5va/reports.htm

Women's trampoline
2000 Women's
2000 in women's gymnastics
Women's events at the 2000 Summer Olympics